The Stabina is a stream in the Bergamo Alps of northern Italy. It begins at the Pizzo Tre Signori, and after , it flows into the river Brembo near the village of Olmo al Brembo.

Rivers of Italy
Rivers of Lombardy
Rivers of the Province of Bergamo